The 2009 Netball Superleague Grand Final featured Team Bath and Galleria Mavericks. Having previously played each other in both the 2006 and 2007 grand finals, this was third final that featured Team Bath and Mavericks. This was Team Bath's third grand final and Mavericks fourth. As with the two previous encounters, it was Team Bath that emerged as winners. The Mavericks netted 46 of their 52 chances, while Team Bath claimed 54 from 62.

Route to the Final

Match summary

Teams

References

2008–09 Netball Superleague season
2008-09
Team Bath (netball) matches
Mavericks Netball matches
Netball Superleague